The Petroleum Revenue Oversight and Control Committee (Collège de Contrôle et de Surveillance des Ressources Pétrolières) is a Chadian government watchdog committee in charge of overseeing the government's use of petrol reserves and revenues.

The committee is composed of:
one magistrate of the Supreme Court
one Deputy
one Senator
General Director of the Treasury
National Director of the Bank of the Central African States (BEAC)
four representatives from civil society (one from a local NGO, one from a trade union, one from a human rights organization, and one representative of the major religious groups of Chad, Muslim and Christian), to alternate.
Source: Article 6 and 7 of establishing decree.

The committee exercises control over the oil revenues from the oil fields at Kome, Miandoum and Bolobo.

See also

 Nigerian National Petroleum Corporation

External links
Governmental decree regarding the creation of the committee accessed February 2, 2006

Petroleum in Chad
Government of Chad
Energy regulatory authorities
Regulation in Chad